Goghin may refer to:

Goghin, Bazèga, Burkina Faso
Goghin, Boulgou, Burkina Faso
Goghin, Ganzourgou, Burkina Faso